Metro International is a Swedish global media company based in Luxembourg that publishes the Metro newspapers. Metro International's advertising sales have grown at a compound annual growth rate of 41 percent since launch of the first newspaper edition in 1995. It is a freesheet, meaning that distribution is free, with revenues thus generated entirely through advertising. This newspaper is primarily intended for commuters who move daily in and out of big cities' business areas, mainly during rush hours.

The company was founded by Per Andersson and started as a subsidiary of the Modern Times Group along with Viasat Broadcasting. It is now controlled through the Mats Qviberg owned investment company Custos. The first edition of the newspaper was published as Metro Stockholm and distributed in the Stockholm metro. , all European editions (except for the Hungarian one) have been sold, reportedly so that Metro International can focus on Latin America, considered the last growth market for free newspapers.

Metro newspapers

, there were 56 daily editions in 15 languages and in 19 countries across Europe, North and South America, and Asia, for an audience of more than 17 million daily readers and 37 million weekly readers.

Metro newspaper editions are distributed in high-traffic commuter zones or in public transport networks, via a combination of self-service racks and by hand distributors on weekdays. Saturday editions are published in Stockholm, Santiago, São Paulo, and Lima. The distribution points are located either in or around public transport networks (subways, trains, buses, trams), office buildings, retail outlets, at key distribution points on busy streets, or in other high-density population areas such as college campuses.

Metro International launched several editions in Canada during 2000, leading to the creation of several commuter newspaper competitors, such as Sun Media's 24 Hours.

The local name of the Metro newspaper editions may vary due to trademark issues. Peruvian, Chilean, and Mexican editions are called Publimetro, and the Spanish edition is named Metro Directo.

Not all newspapers named Metro are part of the Metro International group. Associated Newspapers publishes another freesheet called Metro in twelve areas around Britain. This UK Metro is not related to Metro International, which used the name Morning News for its (now defunct) freesheet distributed there. However, Metro International and Associated Metro do collaborate on the Dublin Metro Herald newspaper (launched 10 October 2005), which they both own a third of, along with The Irish Times. The Dublin Metro newspaper uses the Associated Metro logo and format, however. It is reported that Metro International has plans to launch a rival free evening newspaper in London.

There are also other examples of newspapers named Metro that are not part of the Metro International Group. In Belgium, Mass Transit Media, a joint venture of Concentra and Rossel, publishes the free daily newspaper Metro. In California, Metro Silicon Valley is a free weekly newspaper which was founded in 1985. Neither of these newspapers have links to Metro International.

In Hong Kong, Metro International sold Metro Daily in 2013 to a local businessman.

Timeline of Metro editions
 Metro was first launched in Stockholm on 13 February 1995.
 The first international edition launched in Budapest, Hungary in Hungarian (1998) and became the most popular daily with 400.000 daily edition. The newspaper had two editions, in the countryside and in Budapest. The popular Metro - later renamed as Metropol - was sold to a Hungarian private editor in 2011 and became target of the political fights. The newspaper was closed in 2015. On 7 September 2020, the daily restarted with the British Metro look and the same name, renaming the pro-government tabloid Lokál. 
 A German-language edition is published in Switzerland by Metro Publication (Schweiz) AG under the name Metropol on 31 January 2000 as a direct competitor to 20 Minuten. The newspaper ceased publication without announcement on 13 February 2002.
 In 2000, a Spanish edition named Publimetro is published in Buenos Aires, Argentina, with a circulation of 390,000. Facing competition from the free daily La Razón published by Grupo Clarín, Publimetro is suspended indefinitely a year later.
 A weekly magazine named Metropop starts publication in Hong Kong on 27 April 2006 (published on Thursdays).
 At the end of 2006, Metro started a dedicated technology paper, Metro Teknik (English section) which is distributed weekly to companies, science parks, and technical universities around Sweden.
 Due to financial difficulties in the press sector in general, and the free press in particular, Metro International closed down its Polish edition on 5 January 2007. Earlier, the Danish afternoon version of the newspaper was closed down, and the business in Finland was sold.
 As of October 2008, the Croatian Metro edition was also cancelled, due to disappointing advertorial income.
 As of 29 January 2009, Metro International closed down its Spanish operations.
 In 2009, Metro sold its US papers.
 As of 31 May 2012, Metro International was delisted from the NASDAQ OMX Stockholm stock exchange.
 In August 2016, the French version of the newspaper, published since 2002 and property of TF1 since 2011, is discontinued.
 In September 2016, the Portuguese version of the newspaper, published since 2004 and property of Cofina since 2009, is discontinued.
 In August 2019, the newspaper ceased operations in Sweden.
 On 20 March 2020 the last Netherlands edition of the Metro, published since 21 June 1999, was distributed. It continues as an online news platform, owned by Mediahuis Nederland B.V.

Metro editions by region

Asia
 South Korea: Metro is published in Busan and Seoul.
 Hong Kong: Metro was distributed across MTR stations in Kowloon, Hong Kong Island, Tsuen Wan and Tseung Kwan O until 2019, when it stopped publishing newspapers. Since then, it has been an internet-only newspaper.

Europe
There are national editions in the Czech Republic, Denmark, Greece, Hungary, Italy, Finland, the Netherlands (online only), Russia, and Sweden (Metro). City editions of Metro are published in many major cities.

Belgium has a bilingual free newspaper with the same name, but it is not owned by Metro International. Likewise, Metro in the United Kingdom is not part of the network.
In France, the Metronews has been acquired and merged by the media company LCI - itself property of TF1.

North America

 Canada: The first Canadian Metro paper was launched in Toronto in 2000, and eventually launched in multiple cities across Canada through joint ventures with Canadian companies or through brand licensing. By 2020, only the French-language Montreal edition will remain.
English-language: Became a 50-50 joint venture with Torstar in 2001. In 2017, Postmedia Network acquired Metro in Ottawa and discontinued the publication. Metro International sold most of its stake in English-Canadian newspapers to Torstar in 2011. It continued to hold a 10% stake in the StarMetro newspaper chain published in Calgary, Edmonton, Halifax, Toronto, and Vancouver. Publication ceased on 20 December 2019. 
French-language: Métro is published in French in Montreal and is wholly owned by TC Transcontinental, which licenses the Metro brand. It is distributed throughout Montreal and its suburbs and has a readership of one million.
 Mexico: Publimetro is published in Guadalajara, Mexico City, and Monterrey.
 United States: Metro is published in Philadelphia and Puerto Rico. It was formerly published in Boston and New York City, where the New York City edition was acquired by Schneps Media (which also acquired the Philadelphia edition of Metro) and merged the New York City edition of Metro with AM New York to form AM New York Metro.

Nicaragua: Metro is published in Managua.

Guatemala: Metro is published in Guatemala City.

South America
 Brazil: Metro is published in major metropolitan regions including Belo Horizonte, and São Paulo
 Chile: Metro is published in major conurbations including Concepción, Rancagua, Santiago, Talcahuano, and Valparaíso
 Colombia: Metro is published in Bogotá, Medellín, Cali, and Barranquilla
 Ecuador: Metro is published in Guayaquil, Quito and Cuenca
 Peru: Metro is published in Lima

See also
 List of newspapers in Canada
 List of newspapers in the Czech Republic

References

External links
 

Publications established in 1995
Newspaper companies of Sweden
Newspaper companies
Free daily newspapers
Stenbeck family